Scopula diffinaria is a moth of the  family Geometridae. It is found in Armenia, Georgia, Russia and Turkey.

The larvae possibly feed on Silene species and Linum catharticum.

References

Moths described in 1913
diffinaria
Moths of Europe
Moths of Asia